During the 1980-81 season Milan Associazione Calcio competed in Coppa Italia and for the first time ever in Serie B.

Summary 

Owing to Totonero sentences and after appeals, Owner Felice Colombo appointed Gaetano Morazzoni as new President. For the first time ever the club played the Serie B tournament, several players were transferred in such as   Avellino Goalkeeper Ottorino Piotti, Defender Mauro Tassotti from Lazio   and midfielder Stefano Cuoghi from Modena. Meanwhile, midfielder Alberto Bigon and Forward Stefano Chiodi were transferred out to S.S. Lazio, midfielder Fabio Capello retires after injuries and Goalkeeper Enrico Albertosi is banned two years after Totonero. Also arrived to reinforce the first team Sergio Battistini, Alberico Evani and Andrea Icardi from the Youth squad.

In Coppa Italia, the team was early eliminated in first round thanks to a 1-1 draw against Avellino and a poor won match 1-0 against Catania. Two defeats against Palermo and archrival Inter finishes the chances to clinch the second round.

In 1980-81 Serie B the squad reaches the promotion to Serie A, securing the goal in the second last league match against Monza. After the result head coach Massimo Giacomini left the squad, therefore Italo Galbiati was caretaker for the last match against Pescara closing the season as Leader two points ahead of Runners-up Genoa C.F.C.

Squad

Transfers

Competitions

Serie B

League table

Results by round

Matches

Coppa Italia

First round

Matches

Statistics

Squad statistics

Players statistics

See also

References

External links 

A.C. Milan seasons
Italian football clubs 1980–81 season